Trivellona is a genus of small sea snails, marine gastropod mollusks in the family Triviidae, the false cowries or trivias.

Species 
Species within the genus Trivellona include:

Trivellona abyssicola (Schepman, 1909)
 Trivellona aequabilis Fehse, 2017
 Trivellona aliquando Fehse, 2015
Trivellona bealsi Rosenberg & Finley, 2001
Trivellona bulla Dolin, 2001
 Trivellona caelatura (Hedley, 1918)
 Trivellona carina Fehse, 2017
Trivellona catei Grego & Fehse, 2004
Trivellona conjonctiva Dolin, 2001
 † Trivellona darraghi Fehse & Grego, 2008 
 Trivellona desirabilis (Iredale, 1912)
Trivellona dolini Grego & Fehse, 2004
Trivellona eglantina Dolin, 2001
 Trivellona ellenae Fehse, 2017
 Trivellona enricoschwabei Fehse & Grego, 2012
Trivellona eos (Roberts, 1913)
Trivellona excelsa Iredale, 1931
Trivellona finleyi (Beals, 2001)
Trivellona galea Dolin, 2001
 Trivellona gilbertoi Fehse, 2015
Trivellona globulus Grego & Fehse, 2004
 Trivellona hansposti Fehse, 2017
 Trivellona haplomorpha Fehse, 2017
 Trivellona homala Fehse, 2017
 Trivellona inflata Fehse, 2017
 Trivellona inopinata Fehse, 2020
 † Trivellona kendricki Fehse & Grego, 2008  
Trivellona kiiensis (Kuroda & Cate in Cate, 1979)
 Trivellona lactea Fehse, 2017
 Trivellona laurenti Fehse, 2017
 Trivellona litolabra Fehse, 2017
 † Trivellona lochi Fehse & Grego, 2008  
 † Trivellona makranica Harzhauser, 2017
Trivellona marlowi (Rosenberg & Finley, 2001)
Trivellona opalina (Kuroda & Cate in Cate, 1979)
 Trivellona ovata Fehse, 2017
 Trivellona panglaoica Fehse, 2017
Trivellona paucicostata (Schepman, 1909)
 Trivellona plana Fehse, 2017
 Trivellona puillandrei Fehse, 2017
 Trivellona pulchra Fehse & Grego, 2012
 Trivellona pyrifera Fehse, 2017
 Trivellona rugosa Fehse, 2017
Trivellona sagamiensis (Kuroda & Habe in Kuroda, Habe & Oyama, 1971)
 Trivellona samadiae Fehse, 2015
 Trivellona samarensis (C. N. Cate, 1979)
Trivellona schepmani (Schilder, 1941)
 Trivellona shimajiriensis (MacNeil, 1961)
Trivellona sibogae (Schepman, 1909)
Trivellona speciosa (Kuroda & Cate in Cate, 1979)
 Trivellona suavis (Schilder, 1931)
Trivellona suduirauti (Lorenz, 1996)
Trivellona syzygia Dolin, 2001
Trivellona valerieae (Hart, 1996)

Synonyms
 Trivellona costata (Gmelin, 1791): synonym of Triviella costata (Gmelin, 1791)
 Trivellona dumaliensis (C. N. Cate, 1979): synonym of Niveria nix (Schilder, 1922)
 Trivellona eratoides (Liltved, 1986): synonym of Triviella eratoides (Liltved, 1986)
 Trivellona multicostata (Liltved, 1986): synonym of Triviella multicostata (Liltved, 1986)
Trivellona oligopleura Dolin, 2001: synonym of Trivellona paucicostata (Schepman, 1909)
 Trivellona sharonae (Hayes, 1993): synonym of Triviella sharonae (Hayes, 1993)
 Trivellona vesicularis (Gaskoin, 1836): synonym of Triviella vesicularis (Gaskoin, 1836)

References 

 Fehse D. & Grego J. (2004) Contribution to the knowledge of the Triviidae (Mollusca: Gastropoda). IX. Revision of the genus Trivellona. Berlin and Banska Bystrica. Published as a CD in 2004; as a book in 2009.

External links 
 Iredale, T. (1931). Australian molluscan notes. Nº I. Records of the Australian Museum. 18(4): 201-235
 Cate, C. N. (1979). A review of the Triviidae (Mollusca: Gastropoda). San Diego Society of Natural History, Memoir. 10: 1-126

Triviidae